The Quiet Birdmen is a secretive club in the United States for male aviators. Founded in 1921 by World War I pilots, the organization meets in various locations, never announced to the public. Members, called QBs, must be invited to join, and they join for life. Today, the club's membership, organized into regional "hangars", is made up primarily of retired airline, military and freight pilots, as well as a few astronauts. It is also known as ye Anciente and Secret Order of Quiet Birdmen.

History
In France in November 1919, a group of World War I aviators started a drinking club called "The American Flying Club", and re-convened in New York City only to be barred from their clubhouse by the bailiff. In January 1921, a subset of that group, some ten to twenty aviators, began meeting fairly regularly on Monday nights in New York City at Marta, an Italian restaurant located at 75 Washington Place in the Greenwich Village neighborhood. Harold Hersey, the editor of Aces High magazine, ironically called the group the Quiet Birdmen because they were so boisterous. At one meeting, reporter Steve Hannigan noticed the jocular group, and visited again the next week, bringing a sketch artist. Hannigan wrote up a feature story about the group, accompanied by a sketch—the first public information about the group. The attendees that night were Harry Bruno, S. H. MacKeon, Wallace James, Richard R. "Dick" Blythe, Earle D. Osborn, Charles S. "Casey" Jones, Harold T. "Slim" Lewis, Ernest Loftquis, Paul G. Zimmerman, Donald Mcllhenny, Ladislas d'Orcy, Richard H. DePew Jr, George Hubbard, R. B. C. Noorduyn, John (Jack) Bishop and J. E. Whitbeck. Because the group grew too large, or because of the noise bothering other patrons, the management at Marta stopped them from meeting there. Subsequent meetings were held in a different location each time, often a restaurant. Membership in the 1920s cost one dollar and lasted until death. In the 1920s the emblem of the club was created: a blue shield with the letters QB in silver, the shield flanked by silver wings. In 1938, the club's meetings settled into the building owned by the Architectural League of New York.

Harvey Mummert, vice president and chief engineer of Mercury Aircraft, has been credited as co-founder of the club. Early members Bruno and Blythe started a public relations firm in 1923 and in 1927 they became known for promoting Charles Lindbergh's solo trans-Atlantic flight. Lindbergh was made a member of the Quiet Birdmen. Unusually, a former combat foe was invited to join the club: Ernst Udet, the highest-scoring German flying ace to survive World War I. Known as a fun-loving playboy, Udet performed aerobatics at the National Air Races in Cleveland in 1931 and '32, Los Angeles in '33, and again in Cleveland in '38. While visiting the U.S., Udet befriended Lindbergh, Eddie Rickenbacker, Jimmy Doolittle, Wiley Post, Roscoe Turner and other American QBs.

Outside of New York, other Quiet Birdmen regional groups, or hangars, were formed. Before 1938, the club had a strict agreement against having a constitution, by-laws, dues, assessments, or club officers. No business was to be conducted, and no sales. Only male aviators were allowed to join, not female aviators or "Keewees" (non-flyers). At the Cleveland Air Races in 1938, the QBs adopted a slightly more formal arrangement: a Board of Governors would be composed of one member from each hangar, and this board would choose an Executive Committee. Each regional hangar was to select a Key Man to handle club business. A year later, the group settled upon a QB Code of Procedure which described the structure of the club. During World War II in London, England, a temporary hangar was formed in 1943 for club members posted to the UK. The club's national Code of Procedure was modified again in 1953.

In addition to the still existing New York Hangar, other early Hangars, originally called "leantos" to the original New York Hangar, had been formed.  Currently Hangars are formed independently and exist in Washington DC, Cleveland, Atlantic City, Wayne, San Francisco Bay Area, Los Angeles, Palomar in San Diego County, Oxnard/Santa Barbara, Fresno, Santa Ana, Long Beach, Palm Desert, Philadelphia, Rhode Island, Ocala, Seattle, North Cascade in northern Washington state, Milwaukee, Fort Worth, Amarillo, Dallas, Houston, Phoenix, Columbia, Hilton Head and Greenville in South Carolina, Daytona Beach, Honolulu, Kalamazoo, Lansing, Boise, Hartford, Rockford, Akron, Indiana, Syracuse, Las Vegas, Cincinnati, Tampa Bay, Orlando, Melbourne, Venice, Stuart, Jackson, Knoxville, Wilmington, Greensboro, New Orleans, Cape Cod, Kansas City, Austin, Dallas, San Antonio, Buffalo, Rochester, Binghamton, Fort Smith, Chicago, Jackson Hole, Boston, Somerville, Hilton Head, Anchorage, Hagerstown, Denver, Lehigh Valley, Pennsylvania, Atlanta, Waterloo, and Tulsa, Shreveport, Colorado Springs, Salt Lake City, Pensacola, Trenton, Bangor, Portland and perhaps other cities throughout the US.

Activities
Depending on its location, QB regular activities generally reflect the age of its members. Typical QB get-togethers start with a silent toast to deceased members, glasses raised to the west in keeping with an old pilot's expression euphemistically referring to death as having "Gone West." Food and drink are served, and perhaps a talk or other program is given. Off-color jokes are plentiful. Occasionally semi-nude female entertainment has been seen at some of the meetings, especially the Wing Dings, which are larger parties held in late spring or summer.

The Quiet Birdmen print a periodical called BEAM which features stories, jokes, and news of hangar get-togethers. No photos of QB parties are allowed in the journal. From time to time, various hangars have published commemorative membership books consisting of a brief recounting of the club's history, and photograph portraits of individual members. One such book was owned by club member K. S. "Slim" Lindsay, printed in May 1936. After Lindsay's death, it was donated in 2007 by his daughter to Wright State University. The leather-bound book has 160 pages and 640 photographs of Quiet Birdmen including portraits of Jimmy Doolittle, Wiley Post, Roscoe Turner, Walter R. Brookins and Ephraim Watkins "Pop" Cleveland. Another QB book was donated to the National Air and Space Museum by Arthur Raymond Brooks; it contains photographs of the members of the New York hangar and a description of the history and by-laws of the club.

Astronaut Edward Givens died in a car crash following a QB meeting. On a rainy Monday night, June 5, 1967, the Houston hangar of Quiet Birdmen met at the Skylane Motel on Telephone Road in Pearland, Texas. Fellow astronaut Gordon Cooper was there, and so were two U.S. Air Force reservists who had just been invited to their first QB meeting: Major William "Bill" Hall and Lieutenant Colonel Francis "Fran" Dellorto. Hall and Dellorto were told that they would become full members after attending twelve meetings. Givens was not drinking alcoholic beverages at the party as he was required at an important meeting the following morning. Between 11:30 pm and midnight, Givens offered Hall and Dellorto a ride back to their quarters at Ellington Air Force Base in Houston, and the three left the motel in Givens' Volkswagen Beetle. Givens drove north toward the main east–west highway, but mistakenly turned east onto parallel Knapp Road. He missed a sharp turn in the road and the car crashed into an irrigation ditch. Though he was wearing his lap belt, Givens' chest was crushed against the steering wheel. In the front passenger seat, Dellorto was seriously injured, while in the back seat, Hall was in fair condition. Givens, 37 years old, died on the way to the hospital early on June 6, pronounced dead on arrival at 12:40 am.

In Ventura, California, on a Monday night in October 1974, Ben Rich gave a talk to the Oxnard and Santa Barbara hangar of Quiet Birdmen about the Skunk Works program at Lockheed. Rich spoke of the Lockheed U-2 and SR-71 Blackbird programs which had recently been declassified, and identified QB member and attendee R. Scott Beat as a former U-2 pilot. Beat wrote in his book So Many Ways to Die: Surviving As a Spy in the Sky that this was the first time any of his friends or family had heard of that part of his past—he had faithfully kept the government's secrets to himself.

Beginning in 1971, rancher and aviator John S. "Jack" Broome, a founding member of the Oxnard hangar, held an annual private airshow and barbecue for the Quiet Birdmen at his ranch in Camarillo, California. Members of the Commemorative Air Force and Planes of Fame often piloted several of their warbirds at the events. After Broome died in April 2009, the 39th annual airshow was held in his memory in June 2009. The Broome family hosted one final private airshow for the Quiet Birdmen on June 14, 2010.

Notable members

 Buzz Aldrin
 Edwin Eugene Aldrin Sr.
Walter Beech
 Floyd Bennett
 Forrest Bird
 Ennio Bolognini
 Arthur Raymond Brooks
 Jack Broome
 Harry Bruno
 Richard E. Byrd
 Gordon Cooper
 Glenn Curtiss
 Eugene Peyton Deatrick
 Jimmy Doolittle
 Charles Stark Draper
 Robert G. Fowler
 Fitzhugh Fulton
 Ernest K. Gann
 Edward Givens
 Chalmers Goodlin
 Najeeb Halaby
 Caleb V. Haynes
 Cliff Henderson
Bob Hoover
Elrey Borge Jeppesen
Alvin M. Johnston
Bert Kinner
Fiorello LaGuardia, Mayor of New York
 Dean Ivan Lamb
 Walter E. Lees
Tony LeVier
 Charles Lindbergh
 John H. Livingston
 Johnny Miller
Edgar Mitchell
 Zack Mosley
 Clyde Edward Pangborn
 Wiley Post
 Eddie Rickenbacker
 Charles E. Rosendahl
Burt Rutan
Johnny Rutherford, Three Time Indy 500 Winner
Wally Schirra
Igor Sikorsky
Charles Kingsford Smith
 Dean Smith, of the Byrd Expeditions, Air Mail Pilot
Lloyd Stearman
 Moye W. Stephens
 Jack Swigert
 Richard G. Thomas
 Juan Trippe
 Roscoe Turner
 Ernst Udet
Albert Lee Ueltschi
 Hoyt Vandenberg
 Jerry Vasconcells
 Chance M. Vought
Dwane Wallace
Fred Weick
 George Hubert Wilkins
 Alfred Worden

See also
 Order of Daedalians

References

Flying clubs
Aviation organizations based in the United States
Clubs and societies in the United States
Men's organizations in the United States
Organizations established in 1921